Lunularic acid decarboxylase is an enzyme that converts lunularic acid into lunularin.

A lunularic acid decarboxylase has been detected from the liverwort Conocephalum conicum.

References 

EC 4.1.1
Dihydrostilbenoids metabolism